Hermann Friedrich Bonorden (28 August 1801 – 19 May 1884) was a German physician and mycologist. During his career he served as a Regimentarzt (regimental medical doctor) in Köln.

In 1866, Stephan Schulzer von Müggenburg named the fungi genus Bonordenia in his honor. The genus Bonordeniella was named after him by Albert Julius Otto Penzig and Pier Andrea Saccardo (1901). Bonorden was the author of numerous mycological taxa, the following are some of the genera that he circumscribed:
 Fusicolla (1851).
 Hormomyces (1851).
 Cornicularia (1851), syn. Clavulinopsis.
 Polythecium (1861), syn. Fusicoccum.
 Byssitheca (1864), syn. Rosellinia.

Written works 
He was the author of books in the fields of medicine and mycology, the following are three of his mycological efforts:
 Handbuch der allgemeinen Mykologie, 1851 - Manual of general mycology.
 Zur Kenntniss einiger der wichtigsten Gattungen der Coniomyceten und Cryptomyceten, 1860 - To the knowledge of some of the major genera of Coniomycetes and Cryptomycetes.   
 Abhandlungen aus dem Gebiete der Mykologie, 1864 - Treatises from the field of mycology.

References 

 

1801 births
1884 deaths
German mycologists